Jeff Berry (born  1949 died May 31, 2013) was the former leader of the American Knights of the Ku Klux Klan in Newville, Indiana. He was sentenced to seven years in prison on December 4, 2001, for conspiracy to commit criminal confinement with a deadly weapon. The charges stemmed from a 1999 incident in which Berry refused to allow a local reporter and a photographer to leave his home following an interview.

Leadership

In an interview, Berry identified himself as the Klan's "national imperial wizard". In a book written by his former assistant and now former Klansman, Brad Thompson, Berry's Klan was described as "a gigantic financial rip-off designed to line the pockets of its top leadership".

Berry later left the Klan six months after Jacob Holdt, a Danish photographer, produced a documentary with him about racism. After leaving the Klan, Berry was physically assaulted by other Klan members, including his son, who believed that Berry had betrayed his race. This assault resulted in him becoming blind and an invalid.

Books
 Thompson, Brad and Worth Weller. Under The Hood: Unmasking the Modern Ku Klux Klan . Thompson is the former Indiana "grand dragon" of the American Knights of the Ku Klux Klan. Weller is a journalist.

Death
On June 7, 2013, the Southern Poverty Law Center reported that Berry had died from lung cancer, on May 31, 2013, in a hospital in Cook County, Illinois.

References

External links
  A prisoner of love, not hate by anti-racism activism Jacob Holdt, asserting Berry was innocent and covering up for a relative of his.

1950s births
2013 deaths
1999 crimes in the United States
People from DeKalb County, Indiana
Leaders of the Ku Klux Klan
Ku Klux Klan crimes
Gang members
Year of birth uncertain
American blind people
American prisoners and detainees
Deaths from cancer in Illinois
Ku Klux Klan in Indiana
American Ku Klux Klan members